The 42nd District of the Iowa Senate is located in southeastern Iowa, and is currently composed of Henry, Jefferson, Lee, and Washington Counties.

Current elected officials
Jeff Reichman is the senator currently representing the 42nd District.

The area of the 42nd District contains two Iowa House of Representatives districts:
The 83rd District (represented by Martin Graber)
The 84th District (represented by Joe Mitchell)

The district is also located in Iowa's 2nd congressional district, which is represented by Mariannette Miller-Meeks.

Past senators
The district has previously been represented by:

David Readinger, 1983–1988
Elaine Szymoniak, 1989–1992
Mike Gronstal, 1993–2002
Bryan Sievers, 2003–2004
Frank Wood, 2005–2008
Shawn Hamerlinck, 2009–2012
Rich Taylor, 2013-2021
Jeff Reichman, 2021–present

See also
Iowa General Assembly
Iowa Senate

References

42